Jian Yi is a Chinese independent filmmaker, social innovator and food activist. His films Bamboo Shoots and Super, Girls! won a number of international film festival awards. Jian Yi co-founded the ground-breaking China Villager Documentary Project with filmmaker Wu Wenguang in 2004, and founded the IFChina Original Studio in 2008. His works have been shown at numerous film festivals, museums (including at the Museum of Modern Art in New York) and university campuses across the globe. Jian Yi also spoke at the Apple Artists' Series among many public and media talks, including the BBC and the National Public Radio.

Since 2014, Jian Yi has been at the forefront of promoting sustainable food system in China. He founded and preside the Good Food Fund under the China Biodiversity Conservation and Green Development Foundation, one of the ten global Top Visionaries named by the Rockefeller Foundation for its 2050 Food Systems Vision Prize. He was frequently interviewed by international media for his views on China's food systems and appeared on Eating Animals, a documentary produced by Natalie Portman.

Jian Yi served on the Core Leadership Team of Action Track 2 of the United Nations Food Systems Summit between 2020 and 2021 and led the initial Workstream 1 on Food Environments. He has served on a number of roles related to this, including on several UNFSS action areas, FoodXFilm Festival, etc. Jian Yi also led his colleagues to set up the China Action Hub for UNFSS AT2, and organized 10+ independent dialogues on food systems in the first half of 2021, with a combined views of 1 million for their livestreams across platforms. He serves as the Deputy Secretary General of the China Biodiversity Conservation and Green Development Foundation.

Jian Yi founded the China Vegan Society, which was officially launched in Dali, Yunnan, May 2021, receiving supporting messages from celebrated figures such as Peter Singer, Dr. Jane Goodall, and Joaquin Phoenix.

Personal life 
Jian Yi was born in Ji'an, Jiangxi, China in 1975. He lives in Beijing with his wife, Eva Song, and son, Kuankuan.

Education 
Jian Yi received a Bachelor of Education in Education Management from Jiangxi Normal University in 1995, a Master's degree in International Peace Studies from the University of Notre Dame in 1998, and an MA in International Journalism from Beijing Broadcasting Institute in 1999.  Jian received the Distinguished Alumni Award from the Kroc Institute of International Peace Studies at the University of Notre Dame in 2015. Jian Yi studies at the Harvard Kennedy School as a 2021-2022 Mid-Career MPA student (as the only student from China of the year), a Mason Fellow and a Gleitsman Leadership Fellow of the Center for Public Leadership at Harvard Kennedy School.

He was a tenured lecturer at the Communication University of China for five years (1999-2004).

Filmmaking 
Jian Yi is the founder and director of ARTiSIMPLE Studio, which was founded in January 2005 and has pioneered the art of collaborative community and citizen projects. In 2005–2006, he partnered with premier documentary filmmaker Wu Wenguang to launch the China Villager Documentary Project. Jian's photos on China's village governance toured the nation's seven provinces as well as the headquarters of the European Commission in Brussels and the Seat of the European Parliament in Strasbourg.

In 2007, Jian Yi won the Bronze Zenith Award at the 31st Montreal World Film Festival for his feature film Dong Sun ("Bamboo Shoots"), one of only two Asian films to win an award. In 2007 Jian also produced and directed Super, Girls!, the only independently produced documentary film about the Super Girl singing contest, one of the most popular TV shows in China's history. As a result, he was one of the three Chinese national finalists selected by the British Council for the 2007 International Young Film Entrepreneur of the Year award. (Bamboo Shoots officially hit Canadian cinemas on August 26, 2010.)

Social Memories/Civic Engagement 
Jian launched the IFChina in his hometown of Ji'an, birthplace of Mao Zedong's Revolution, in 2008–2009 with Douglas Xiao and Eva Song. IFChina was China's first civic engagement center that focuses solely on documenting social memories through the use of filmmaking, photography, oral history and theater. It was inspired by the China Villager Documentary Project, co-founded by Wu Wenguang and Jian Yi in 2004.

Food systems activism 
Jointly with Yale Hospitality of Yale University, Jian started the China Food Leadership Initiative in 2018 and during the Chinese New Year in 2019, he headed a delegation of seven top Chinese chefs, entrepreneurs, journalists and toured five U.S. universities (Yale, UMass, Harvard, UConn and CIA), where they coached chefs in the host universities on preparing for Chinese New Year banquets and were engaged in dialogues on sustainable food system.  The tour was taken place under the theme of the Food Forward Forum.

Other activism 
In 2012–2014, he lived and worked at the 1700-year-old Buddhist monastery at the foot of Mount Lu, a World Heritage Site.

Jian Yi served as a member of the Art Advisory Board for the Yale-China Association. He was the founding president of the Notre Dame Club of Beijing in 2006.

Fellowships 
 2021 Gleitsman Leadership Fellow, the Center for Public Leadership, Harvard Kennedy School, Harvard University
 2011 delegate to the Asia Society's Asia 21 Young Leaders Summit in Jakarta, Indonesia
 2009 Yale World Fellow (Yale University, New Haven, CT)
 2008–2010 India-China Fellow (New School, New York City)
 2007–2008 Starr Foundation Fellowship (Asian Cultural Council, New York City)
 2007 Visiting Fellow, CRASSH (University of Cambridge, Cambridge, UK)

Awards 
Bamboo Shoots
 Bronze Zenith Award, 27th Montreal World Film Festival
 Digital Cinema Award, 10th Barcelona Asian Film Festival
 Official Selection, Minneapolis-St. Paul International Film Festival, 2008
 Official Selection, 10th Osian's Cinefan Festival of Asian and Arab Cinema, 2008

Super Girls!
 Official Selection, Cambridge Film Festival, 2007
 Official Selection, Documentary Fortnight, Museum of Modern Art, New York, 2008

Filmography

External links 

 Good Food Fund/Academy
 China Village Documentary Project
 Artisimple.com
 IfChina.org
 https://news.yale.edu/2019/01/31/how-did-yale-hospitality-become-lean-green-leader-even-chinas-asking
 https://news.yale.edu/2019/02/01/yale-hosts-top-chinese-chefs-sustainability-focused-culinary-exchange
 https://www.chinadialogue.net/article/show/single/en/11062-A-less-meaty-Year-of-the-Pig-
 Yale World Fellows Program 
 China Vegan Society
 https://www.plantforwardkitchen.org/jian-yi

Interviews 
 Roger Ebert Show - Chinese Cinema, Oct. 2011
 "You Can't Build on an Emptiness," by Dan Edwards, Real Time Arts
 China Dialogue 
 Eating Animals - the documentary: http://www.eatinganimalsmovie.com/
 https://www.theguardian.com/environment/2019/mar/29/can-the-world-quench-chinas-bottomless-thirst-for-milk
 China's cloned cows: meat on the table or environmental disaster? https://www.theguardian.com/global-development/2015/dec/05/chinas-cloned-cows-meat-on-the-table-or-environmental-disaster
 Bloomberg story on China's wet market after outbreak of COVID-19 on 2020: https://www.bloombergquint.com/global-economics/wuhan-is-returning-to-life-so-are-its-disputed-wet-markets
 China Wakes Up to the Need of a Greener Diet: https://www.ft.com/content/afc52d70-1bab-4375-984e-7814a1d0aa7d
 The Rockefeller Foundation short documentary about Jian Yi and the Good Food Fund's vision: https://foodxfilmfestival.org/rockefeller-foundation

Film directors from Jiangxi
Asian Cultural Council grantees
Living people
People from Ji'an
Chinese film directors
Year of birth missing (living people)
Jiangxi Normal University alumni
University of Notre Dame alumni
Communication University of China alumni
Harvard Kennedy School alumni
Mason Fellows